Marian Donat (28 August 1960 – 2 January 2018) was a Polish judoka. He competed in the men's extra-lightweight event at the 1980 Summer Olympics.

References

1960 births
2018 deaths
Polish male judoka
Olympic judoka of Poland
Judoka at the 1980 Summer Olympics
Sportspeople from Szczecin